Jorge Chávez International Airport (Spanish: Aeropuerto Internacional Jorge Chávez)  is Peru's main international and domestic airport. During 2017, the airport served 22,025,704 passengers. Historically, the airport was the hub for Compañía de Aviación Faucett and Aeroperú. Now it serves as a hub for many aviation companies. The airport was named after Peruvian aviator Jorge Chávez (1887–1910).

History

Lima's first airport was the Limatambo Airport in San Isidro. It ceased operations in 1960 due to a lack of space and capacity, and was replaced by the Lima-Callao International Airport. In June 1965, the Lima-Callao airport was renamed the "Aeropuerto Internacional Jorge Chávez" after the famous Peruvian aviator, Jorge Chávez Dartnell. In December 1965, the terminal building was officially opened.

When it was in operation, Compañía de Aviación Faucett had its corporate headquarters on the airport grounds.

In 2001, in order to improve and expand its infrastructure, the government of Peru placed the airport under the management of Lima Airport Partners (LAP). LAP is now composed of Fraport and International Finance Corporation. The air traffic control is managed by the Peruvian Corporation of Airports and Commercial Aviation (CORPAC). The Peruvian government engaged Jaime Malagón, Jerome Jakubik, Paul Slocomb, and Víctor M. Marroquín of Baker and McKenzie international law firm, to oversee the changes.

In February 2005, the first phase of a new renovation and expansion project was completed. This included the Peru Plaza Shopping Center and a new concourse. In June 2007, a four-star hotel, Ramada Costa del Sol, opened at the airport.

In January 2009, the second phase of the terminal expansion was commenced. The terminal has 28 gates, 19 with boarding bridges. In August 2009, the LAP announced that in 2010, the airport would have a new category III instrument landing system to help with landing in foggy conditions. Arquitectonica, a Miami-based architectural office, and Lima Airport Partners planned a second terminal and expansion of the main terminal.

On October 24, 2018, the Peruvian state delivered all the land for the expansion and modernization of the Jorge Chavez airport to the airport operator "Lima Airport Partners".
The estimated investment of US$1,200 million includes the construction of a new runway, a control tower and a passenger terminal in addition to the existing one. On the other hand, the state will build a new bridge and highway on the current Santa Rosa Avenue that will connect directly with the "Costa Verde" highway, benefiting a lot of tourists and entrepreneurs who are only going to visit Miraflores and the south. Works will be completed in 4 years, by the beginning of the year 2023, and will allow the transit of 40 million passengers per year by 2030.

Transport

Transportation between the airport and the city is provided by taxis, tour buses and vans. Airport Express Lima is the official bus of Jorge Chávez Airport. Line 2 and Line 4 of the Lima Metro are currently under construction. Some companies of taxis and buses offer services to visit the city, some of them transit through the avenues: Faucett, Linea Amarilla, Tomás Valle, De La Marina, Colonial and Costa Verde. Some go north, east, to the historic center and the Financial Center; and others towards Miraflores and the south area like Pachacamac and Surco.

Facilities
The airport hosts the Wyndham Costa del Sol hotel which is located adjacent to the control tower and the arrivals exit. The hotel is built with noise canceling panels. The Peru Plaza Shopping Center is located near the passenger terminal in the Grand Concourse area. The food court is located near the entrance of the passenger terminal on the second floor and is always open. There is an ice cream vendor selling some special Peruvian flavours such as Chirimoya and Lucuma.

The airport has numerous premium lounges in the departures terminal, such as VIP Peru. For passengers in first class, there is an exclusive salon near the gates, the VIP Club.

On 12 May 2009, the airport opened Lima Cargo City, a hub for cargo airlines.

Airlines and destinations

Passenger

Cargo

Statistics

Figures

Busiest routes

Accidents and incidents
 November 27, 1962: Varig Flight 810, a Boeing 707-441 registration PP-VJB flying from Rio de Janeiro to Jorge Chávez International Airport, after initiating an overshoot procedure at the suggestion of the control tower because it was too high, proceeded to start another approach when it crashed into La Cruz peak,  from the airport. Possibly there was a misinterpretation of navigation instruments. All 97 passengers and crew aboard died.
 May 8, 1964: an Argentine Air Force Douglas C-54 registration T-47 flying from Buenos Aires to Jorge Chávez International Airport crashed into a sand dune during approach in poor visibility conditions, killing 46 of 49 people on board.
 August 6, 1986: an explosion of unknown origin occurred at a restroom in the domestic terminal.
 December 8, 1987: a Peruvian Navy Fokker 27-400M registration AE-560 flying from Pucallpa to Jorge Chávez International Airport chartered by the Alianza Lima football team crashed into the Pacific Ocean shortly before landing. A malfunctioning cockpit indicator made the crew believe that the landing gear was not properly deployed and locked, so they requested the control tower allow the plane to make a low pass for a visual check by ground personnel. After receiving the confirmation that the landing gear was down, the aircraft circled the airport for another attempt to land, but plunged into the ocean instead, killing all on board except the pilot.
 March 10, 1989: an Aero Condor Britten-Norman BN-2A Islander registration OB-1271 flying from Nazca to Jorge Chavez International Airport crashed into a building during approach killing all on board, apparently due to fuel exhaustion.
 January 25, 1991: a car bomb placed by the Tupac Amaru Revolutionary Movement (MRTA) killed two Peruvians and wounded ten people. The attack occurred in a context of condemnation, by left-wing armed groups and political movements, of Operation Desert Storm; minutes after the attack, the US Embassy in Lima was attacked with an RPG and small arms fire by the MRTA.
 July 24, 1992: five American Airlines employees, charged with cleaning and baggage loading duties, were wounded by a bomb. This happened during the weekend in which Shining Path enforced a 48-hour nationwide "armed strike" that aimed at paralyzing, among other services, public transportation. 
January 22, 1993: three bullets hit the right side of the fuselage of American Airlines Flight 917 (inbound from Miami) while either landing or taxiing on the runway after landing. There were no casualties and damage to the plane was minimal. Despite Shining Path (SP) claiming responsibility for the attack, a subsequent investigation failed to identify the actual assailants. Airport authorities reportedly stated that the source of the shots was accidental, originating in a security guard working in the perimeter. The incident, occurring in the context of a decade-long leftist insurgency against the Peruvian state, happened in the midst of a surge of terrorist attacks and assassinations during that month which also targeted US interests and businesses.
 April 15, 1995: an Imperial Air Tupolev Tu-134A-3 registration OB-1553 flying from Cusco to Jorge Chavez International Airport suffered a tire failure after departure. The crew decided to continue the flight to Lima, but the left main landing gear did not extend during landing. There were no fatalities, but the aircraft was damaged beyond repair.
 October 2, 1996: Flight 603, an AeroPerú Boeing 757-23A registration N52AW flying the Miami-Lima-Santiago, Chile route crashed into the Pacific Ocean some minutes after its takeoff from Jorge Chávez International Airport, killing all on board. The accident investigation found that masking tape was accidentally left over the static ports during maintenance, rendering the airspeed indicator, altimeter and vertical speed indicator unreliable.
On October 11, 2013, an Airbus A320 (registration N492TA) from TACA Airlines, made an emergency landing at 8:20 am Local Time. The pilot declared an emergency due to smoke in the cockpit. The aircraft was en route from Jorge Chávez International Airport to El Salvador International Airport, San Salvador, El Salvador. There were 31 passengers plus crew on board. The aircraft landed safely.
 On November 18, 2022, a LATAM Peru A320neo taking off as Flight 2213 to Juliaca collided with a fire engine that was crossing the runway, killing two firefighters and injuring a third. All 102 passengers and 6 crew aboard the plane escaped unharmed.

See also
 Transport in Peru
 List of airports in Peru
 Fraport AG
 Lima Airport Partners
 CORPAC
 Aeropuertos del Perú, another airport operator
 Travel Test Clinics in Peru, Travel Restrictions for International Travel from Peru

References

External links

 

Airports in Peru
Buildings and structures in Callao Region
Transport in Lima